Matteo Dal-Cin (born 14 January 1991) is a Canadian cyclist, who currently rides for UCI Continental team .

Major results

2009
 2nd Time trial, National Junior Road Championships
2011
 3rd Time trial, National Under-23 Road Championships
2013
 Canada Summer Games
1st  Individual time trial
2nd  Road race
 3rd Time trial, National Under-23 Road Championships
2014
 1st Stage 2 Tucson Bicycle Classic
 1st Stage 3 Tour de White Rock
 8th White Spot / Delta Road Race
2015
 1st  Overall Grand Prix Cycliste de Saguenay
1st Stage 1
 2nd Criterium, National Road Championships
 2nd Overall Tucson Bicycle Classic
1st Stage 2
2016
 1st Overall Redlands Bicycle Classic
 6th Overall Grand Prix Cycliste de Saguenay
2017
 National Road Championships
1st  Road race
6th Time trial
 1st Stage 2 Tour de Beauce
 9th Overall Tour of the Gila
1st Stage 1
2020
 7th UCI Esports World Championships
2022
 1st  Overall South Aegean Tour
1st Stage 2
 2nd Overall Tour of the Gila
 10th International Rhodes Grand Prix

References

External links

1991 births
Living people
Canadian male cyclists
Sportspeople from Ottawa